Wolfgang Warnemünde (born 8 May 1953 in Grevesmühlen) is a retired East German discus thrower.

He finished eighth at the 1978 European Athletics Championships and won the bronze medal at the 1982 European Athletics Championships.

He represented the sports team SC Empor Rostock. He never became East German champion, but won silver medals at the national championships in 1977, 1978, 1982 and 1984.

His personal best throw was 67.56 metres, achieved in June 1980 in Rostock. This result ranks him ninth among German discus throwers, behind Jürgen Schult, Lars Riedel, Wolfgang Schmidt, Armin Lemme, Hein-Direck Neu, Alwin Wagner, Michael Möllenbeck and Rolf Danneberg.

References

1953 births
Living people
German male discus throwers
East German male discus throwers
European Athletics Championships medalists
Universiade medalists in athletics (track and field)
Universiade silver medalists for East Germany
Universiade bronze medalists for East Germany
Medalists at the 1977 Summer Universiade
Medalists at the 1981 Summer Universiade
People from Grevesmühlen
Sportspeople from Mecklenburg-Western Pomerania